TheraBreath is a brand of oral care products with its headquarters in Los Angeles, California. The company's products treat issues related to halitosis. The company is known as the Breath Company in the United Kingdom.

History
TheraBreath was formed by Dr. Harold Katz in 1993. Its products use chlorine dioxide to treat bad breath as well as issues surrounding the tongue, throat, gum tissue, and tonsils.

References

External links
 Official website

Brands of toothpaste
Oral hygiene
Products introduced in 1994